Centralia Elementary School District is a public school district based in Orange County, California, United States.

Schools
The Centralia Elementary School District serves Preschool through 6th graders in the cities of Buena Park, Anaheim, and La Palma.  All eight schools in the district are award-winning elementary schools.

 Buena Terra
 Centralia
 Danbrook
 Dysinger
 Los Coyotes
 Miller
 Raymond Temple
 San Marino

History
Established in 1875, the District's eight elementary schools currently serve 4,500 students in the cities of Anaheim, Buena Park, Cypress, and La Palma. Centralia School District was the first school district in California to provide free textbooks to students, and today is one of only three school districts in Orange County that is not "program improvement". In 2019, the Centralia School District was the first school district in the State of California to offer universal preschool.

According to the 2010 Census, the District's resident population is 55,193 with a demographic of 34% Hispanic, 30% White, 29% Asian, 4% Black, and 3% Other/Mixed Race.

The District is known for their award-winning Food Services program and for having a campus with the largest school-wide standardized test score increase in the State of California between the 2012–13 and 2013–14 school years.

Board of Trustees
The District is governed by a five-member elected Board of Trustees. In 2014, twenty-year-old Chapman University student Connor Traut was elected to the board of trustees as the youngest Trustee in District history.

Current Trustees are: Henry Charoen, Jerry Flores, Elizabeth Gonzalez, Lamiya Hoque, and Art Montez.

References

External links

School districts in Orange County, California
Education in Anaheim, California
Anaheim, California
Buena Park, California
Cypress, California
La Palma, California
1875 establishments in California
School districts established in 1875